On fleek  may refer to:

"On Fleek" (Eva song), a 2019 song by French singer Eva 
"On Fleek", a song by Offset from his 2019 album Father of 4
"On Fleek", a 2020 song by Yella Beezy

See also
Fleek, a surname